The 1959 Bolivian Primera División, the first division of Bolivian football (soccer), was played by 12 teams. The champions was Jorge Wilstermann.

Torneo Nacional Mixto

Standings

External links
 Official website of the LFPB 

Bolivian Primera División seasons
Bolivia
1959 in Bolivian sport